The climate of Chicago is classified as hot-summer humid continental (Köppen: Dfa). All four seasons are distinctly represented: Winters are cold and often see snow with below 0 Celsius temperatures and windchills, while summers are warm and humid with temperatures being hotter inland, spring and fall bring bouts of both cool and warm weather and fairly sunny skies. Annual precipitation in Chicago is moderate and relatively evenly distributed, the driest months being January and February and the wettest July and August. Chicago's weather is influenced during all four seasons by the nearby presence of Lake Michigan.

Official locations 
The National Weather Service office in Chicago has one of the longest periods of official weather records, dating back to 1870, though all the 1870 and 1871 weather records taken at 181 West Washington Street were lost in the Great Chicago Fire. Of the two major airports located in Chicago, Midway Airport began observations in 1928, and O'Hare Airport began them in 1958. Both sites have served in the past as the official observation location, the latter being the current official station. Weather data from Midway Airport before July 1, 1942, and after January 16, 1980, and data from O'Hare Airport before January 17, 1980, are not part of the official climate record of Chicago.

Here is a list of official weather observation locations for the Chicago office:

Note: Some of the addresses prior to 1909 are different from the post-1909 addresses

Classifications

Data

Seasons

Winter 
Winter in Chicago is generally cold and snowy. The city typically sees less snow in winter than other major cities near the Great Lakes, such as Cleveland or Buffalo, but more snow than that experienced on the East Coast in cities like Washington DC or New York City. Cities on the other side of Lake Michigan usually receive more snow than Chicago because of the lake-effect snow that falls on these communities, even though northeasterly winds can sometimes bring lake-effect snow to Chicago area too.

Winter temperatures are generally cold. However, like much of the northern USA, can vary tremendously within the span of one week. Temperatures drop to or below  on 5.5 nights annually at Midway and 8.2 nights at O'Hare and up to 10–14 nights in some far western and northern suburbs, although subzero (°F) readings in the absence of snow cover are rare. There have been streaks of multiple winter seasons without a single subzero reading, yet there have also been winters with 20 or more subzero readings. Wind speeds reached at least 20 miles per hour, exacerbating the wind chill effect.

The warming effect of Lake Michigan during the winter makes subzero temperatures somewhat less common on the lakefront than in the more inland parts of the city. Highs reach  an average of 8.8 days each winter from December to February at Midway.

Based on 30-year averages obtained from NOAA's National Climatic Data Center for the months of December, January and February, The Weather Channel ranked Chicago the sixth-coldest major U.S. city as of 2014.

In 2012, there were eight days in the month of March with temperatures + (with a ninth day occurring in many suburban areas) during the record-breaking March 2012 North American heat wave. The last couple of  days in this record-breaking stretch of warmth occurred after the vernal equinox.

Spring 
Spring in Chicago is perhaps the city's most unpredictable season: Winter weather can persist until well into April or even into early May, with the 1953-54 winter in Chicago lasting from November until May, as measured by timespan between the first and last measurable snows of the season. Thunderstorms can occur any time of the year but are most prevalent in the springtime as the city's central location within the United States, as well as its lakeside location, makes it a center of conflicts between large volumes of warm and cold air, which can trigger a wide variety of severe weather. The most severe storms can contain large hail, damaging straight-line winds, flooding, and tornadoes. Since 1850, 17 tornadoes have struck the Chicago city limits. During thunderstorms, lightning strikes are seen to frequently hit Chicago's skyscrapers.

Large snowfalls have occurred in late March and in early April. Twelve years later, Opening Day for the Chicago White Sox was postponed due to another  snowfall that had occurred on April 5. The average date for last measurable snowfall (≥) is April 1.

Though rare, triple-digit heat has occurred in late May at Midway Airport and in outlying suburban locations. Typically, the last freezing low of the season on average occurs on April 13 at Midway and ten days later at O'Hare. The highest temperature recorded during the meteorological spring months of March, April, and May is, officially,  on May 31, 1934, when weather records were still taken near Lake Michigan.

During the springtime, the effects of Lake Michigan are most prevalent. During this season, the lake is still quite cold, as the effects of much warmer temperatures are slow to affect the large body of water of Lake Michigan. It is common for Lake Michigan shoreline and water temperatures to remain in the 40s even into May. If the winds blow from the east, or from Lake Michigan into the city, a wide discrepancy in temperatures in a matter of miles can be found, especially on particularly warm days. It is not uncommon for high temperatures to be officially recorded in the 80s or lower 90s °F (27–34 °C), particularly in early June, at O'Hare, Midway, and in suburban locations but to have temperatures be  cooler along the immediate lakeshore.

Summer 
In July, it is not uncommon for the temperature to go around 90 and 93 °F (32 and 34 °C). Conversely, on the other extreme, temperatures can on a rare basis remain above  overnight, though this level of overnight warmth is generally limited to the city proper with its urban heat island effects along with Lake Michigan nearby. On such warm nights, especially during strong heat waves, most suburban locations drop down to between  but quickly rebound in the early morning hours.

A perfect example of such an occurrence happening, although considered "unofficial", occurred during the Dust Bowl years. Midway Airport recorded a record eight consecutive 100 °F-plus days in July 1936. The official record high for Chicago for July 11 is also from 1936—but is recorded as just . Further west in what would today be the near and far suburbs (e.g. DuPage County and westward), temperatures reached a blistering  or still higher at points during this massive heat wave. These extreme temperatures are not shown in the official records because daily weather observations were taken at the University of Chicago until 1942. The University of Chicago is close to the lake, which can and does reduce temperatures in the immediate shoreline area in the summer.

Derechos are also common during the summertime, the most notable being, the August 4, 2008 derecho, which produced five tornadoes across the Chicago area and killed one person. In a normal summer, temperatures exceed  on 23 days. Summer is both the rainiest and sunniest season in Chicago; only the three months of June through August experience more than 65% of possible sunshine.

It was the first time in 65 years that Chicago had ever seen a triad of  days. Chicago nearly recorded a fourth consecutive  day, but the temperature reached 98 degrees at O'Hare in late morning before a weak cold front came through the area and cooled temperatures off slightly in the city area, holding in the lower 90s. The effects of the cold front did not affect many suburban areas, as temperatures reached or exceeded  for a fourth consecutive day throughout much of the region.

During the summer, Lake Michigan continues to have an effect on Chicago weather, but it is not as common or as strong as it is during the spring months. On very hot days, temperatures can still be cooler along the immediate shoreline and slightly inland of the lake if winds blow from the east. Temperatures can be held in the 70s or 80s in these areas while outlying and suburban areas temperatures are rising well into the 90s. Temperatures can also reach extreme levels of heat on the immediate shoreline, such as when the air temperature reached  at Northerly Island during the aforementioned July 2012 heat wave.

Autumn 
The extreme heat that Chicago is capable of experiencing during the height of the summer season can persist into the autumn season. Conversely, temperatures have dropped to freezing overnight as early as September 23, and temperatures below  have arrived as early as November 23. The first freeze of the season on average occurs on October 24 at Midway and 11 days earlier at O'Hare.

Autumn, in some ways, is a calmer season than any of the other three in Chicago. However, wild weather can and does occur in the region during this season. In most years, a period of warm weather, known as an Indian summer, occurs well after the autumnal equinox has occurred. In these so-called Indian summers, unusually warm weather can persist for several days well into October, and in particularly warm autumns, into November. For example, during the 2005 American League Division Series, for both home games between the Chicago White Sox and the Boston Red Sox, temperatures soared to near , despite the fact that it was already well into October. On top of that, during the same warm stretch in October 2005, for two consecutive days the overnight temperature failed to drop below , a rare occurrence for Chicago in October.

Autumn can bring heavy rain showers, some of which are capable of producing serious flooding. As the winter solstice nears, the threat of a major winter or snowstorm grows, and there have been major winter storms around the Thanksgiving holiday, causing major delays at the city's two major airports. The first measurable ≥ snow on average falls on November 19. However, in the 2012–13 winter season, the first measurable snow did not fall until December 20, 2012, eclipsing the previous record of December 17, 1899. The 2012–13 autumn/winter season would fail to produce a daily maximum temperature below freezing  until January 1, 2013, the first such time that has happened in Chicago weather records. The largest snowstorm before the winter solstice dropped  at Midway Airport in December 1929.

During the autumn, the effects of Lake Michigan are usually reversed from the spring or summer, particularly in the late autumn. Temperatures near the immediate lakeshore can be a few degrees warmer than in outlying areas, especially during nighttime due to the delayed effects of cooler temperatures on the large body of water. It is rare, though possible, during the Indian summer when unusually warm temperatures are occurring in the inland areas of the city and suburbs for temperatures to be somewhat cooler along the lake as often happens during the spring season.

Extremes 
The highest temperature ever recorded in the Chicago city limits is an unofficial  on July 24, 1934, at Midway Airport. The 105° high that day is the highest official temperature ever recorded in the city. On July 29, 1916, the low temperature sank to only . Official observations were not moved to Midway Airport in 1942.

Summertime readings near the lake can be several degrees cooler than inland locations, especially if lake breezes are present, which suggests that the higher unofficial reading may also be accurate.

On December 24, 1983, and January 18, 1994, the high temperature reached only .

That event also set the records for heaviest 6 and 12 hour rainfall amounts and contributed to August 1987's record rainfall.

Windy City 
Chicago is known as the Windy City. The "Windy City" moniker did not originally refer to Chicago's climate. It is believed to have been created by a New York newspaper writer deriding Chicagoans' bluster as they promoted their city as the site of the 1893 Columbian Exposition. It is also believed to be called the "Windy City" because of politicians in the area blowing hot air. In terms of climate, Chicago is slightly windier than the average American city.

Lake breeze 

Chicago can be cooler and moister than other parts of Illinois because of its proximity to the relatively cooler waters of Lake Michigan, effects which are most pronounced during spring and early summer. A frequent lakeshore breeze pushes much cooler, moister air into Chicago than the usual hot air of the Plains States (usually a moist air mass depending on upper-level circulation), but the effect can be so localized that only the immediate waterfront neighborhoods (both north and southside lake adjacent communities) are cooler than inland parts of the city. (This is where the oft-repeated weather-forecast phrase “cooler by the lake" comes from.) South, west and southwestern suburbs can be more than 20 °F (11 °C) warmer than the lakefront at some times of year. The lake breeze also has other effects, including dense fog spilling into the city. Because of the closed-loop circulation pattern with a lake breeze that moves back and forth across the city, it is thought to significantly increase low-level ozone counts. Differing wind direction on either side of the thermal dividing line allows for sharp updrafts under certain conditions, favorable to thunderstorm development. Offshore or land breezes shutdown the lake breeze and can have the opposite effect, with over lake convection occurring, usually in mid- to late summer and autumn. As a general rule, the opposite trend occurs during the winter—winter temperatures are warmer along the lakeshore and downtown than inland.

Notes

References 

Geography of Chicago
Chicago
Climate of Illinois